Konar-e Hajji-ye Shekari (also Romanized as Konār-e Ḩājjī-ye Shekārī; also known as Konār-e Ḩājjī and Konār Ḩājjī) is a village in Hashivar Rural District, in the Central District of Darab County, Fars Province, Iran. At the 2006 census, its population was 467, in 103 families.

References 

Populated places in Darab County